Ronnie Silas Dawson Jr. (born May 19, 1995) is an American professional baseball outfielder who is a free agent. The Houston Astros selected him with the 62nd overall selection of the 2016 MLB draft, and he made his MLB debut in 2021. He has also played in MLB for the Cincinnati Reds.

Amateur career
Dawson attended Licking Heights High School in Pataskala, Ohio, where he played baseball and football. He focused on football until his junior year, when he tore his anterior cruciate ligament in his right knee. He had knee surgery before his senior year, and missed the football season. He returned to the baseball team as a senior, in 2013, and had a .576 batting average. The Columbus Dispatch named Dawson their All-Metro Team Player of the Year. He attended Ohio State University, and played college baseball for the Ohio State Buckeyes. He also played collegiate summer baseball for the Chillicothe Paints of the Prospect League. In 2015, he played collegiate summer baseball with the Orleans Firebirds of the Cape Cod Baseball League, and was named a league all-star.

Professional career

Houston Astros
The Houston Astros selected Dawson in the second round, with the 62nd overall selection, of the 2016 Major League Baseball draft. He signed with the Astros, receiving a $1,056,800 signing bonus, and the Astros assigned him to the Tri-City ValleyCats of the Class A Short Season New York-Penn League, where he spent all of 2016, batting .225 with seven home runs and 36 RBIs. In 2017, he played for the Quad Cities River Bandits of the Class A Midwest League and the Buies Creek Astros of the Class A-Advanced Carolina League, posting a combined .278 batting average with 14 home runs, 67 RBIs, and an .800 OPS. He began the 2018 season with Buies Creek, and was promoted to the Corpus Christi Hooks of the Class AA Texas League during the season.

The Astros invited Dawson to spring training as a non-roster player in 2019. After splitting the 2019 season between Corpus Christi and the Triple-A Round Rock Express, Dawson did not play in a game in 2020 due to the cancellation of the 2020 Minor League Baseball season because of the COVID-19 pandemic.

On April 14, 2021, the Astros promoted Dawson to the majors for the first time.  He made his major league debut that day as the Astros’ designated hitter against the Detroit Tigers and recorded his first major league hit, a single off of Alex Lange. On April 20, Dawson was removed from the 40-man roster. In his brief stint, Dawson appeared in three games, recording one hit in six plate appearances.

Cincinnati Reds
On December 8, 2021, the Cincinnati Reds selected Dawson from the Astros organization in the minor league phase of the Rule 5 draft. He was assigned to the Triple-A Louisville Bats to begin the 2022 season.

On May 4, 2022, Dawson was selected to the 40-man and active rosters after Tyler Naquin and Nick Senzel were placed on the COVID-19 injured list. In his season debut the next day, Dawson went 0-for-3 with two strikeouts in a 10-5 loss against the Milwaukee Brewers. He was returned to Triple-A Louisville a day later. Dawson was again selected to the active roster on May 9 after Mike Moustakas was placed on the COVID injured list. He was again returned to Louisville the next day, this time without making an appearance.

Spending the remainder of the season with the Bats, Dawson appeared in 116 games, slashing .252/.339/.394 with 11 home runs, 43 RBI, and 11 stolen bases. He elected free agency on November 10, 2022.

Personal life
As a child, Dawson served as a batboy for the Columbus Clippers of the Class AAA International League.

See also
Rule 5 draft results

References

External links

1995 births
Living people
People from Grove City, Ohio
Baseball players from Ohio
Major League Baseball outfielders
Houston Astros players
Cincinnati Reds players
Ohio State Buckeyes baseball players
Orleans Firebirds players
Tri-City ValleyCats players
Quad Cities River Bandits players
Buies Creek Astros players
Corpus Christi Hooks players
Scottsdale Scorpions players
Round Rock Express players
Sugar Land Skeeters players
Louisville Bats players